Lilia Osterloh (born April 7, 1978) is a retired tennis player from the United States.

Osterloh started a professional career in August 1997.
She reached her highest singles ranking in April 2001, when she became world No. 41 Her career-high doubles ranking is world No. 77, which she reached in August 1999.

In 2013, Osterloh graduated from Stanford University with a degree in International Relations.

College
While at Stanford, she won the Honda Sports Award as the nation's best female tennis player in 1997.

WTA career finals

Doubles: 3 (3–0)

References

External links
 
 

1978 births
Living people
American female tennis players
Sportspeople from Columbus, Ohio
Stanford Cardinal women's tennis players
Tennis players from San Francisco
American people of German descent
Tennis people from Ohio
Tennis players at the 1999 Pan American Games
Pan American Games competitors for the United States